Lisnaskea was a constituency of the Parliament of Northern Ireland. It was located in County Fermanagh and included the namesake town of Lisnaskea.

Boundaries
Lisnaskea was a county constituency comprising the eastern part of County Fermanagh. It was created in 1929, when the House of Commons (Method of Voting and Redistribution of Seats) Act (Northern Ireland) 1929 introduced first-past-the-post elections throughout Northern Ireland. The constituency survived unchanged, returning one member of Parliament, until the Parliament of Northern Ireland was temporarily suspended in 1972, and then formally abolished in 1973.

Politics
Lisnaskea had a unionist majority, but a substantial nationalist minority. The seat was consistently won by the Ulster Unionist Party candidate, and it was only contested on three occasions: in 1949 by a Nationalist candidate, in 1968 by Liberal and independent candidates and in 1969 by the People's Democracy and an independent Unionist candidate.

Members of Parliament

Election results

At the 1929, 1933, 1938 and 1945 general elections, Captain Sir Basil Brooke, 5th Bt., was elected unopposed. From May 1943 to March 1963, Sir Basil (created Viscount Brookeborough in 1952) also served as the 3rd Prime Minister of Northern Ireland.

At the 1953, 1958, 1962 and 1965 general elections, Lord Brookeborough (formerly Sir Basil Brooke) was elected unopposed.

 Parliament prorogued 30 March 1972 and abolished 18 July 1973

References

Northern Ireland Parliament constituencies established in 1929
Constituencies of the Northern Ireland Parliament
Historic constituencies in County Fermanagh
Northern Ireland Parliament constituencies disestablished in 1973